Queens for the Night is a British reality television competition that sees a group of celebrities become drag queens. It aired on 5 November 2022 on ITV. It was presented by Lorraine Kelly with Courtney Act, Rob Beckett, Melanie C and Layton Williams serving as judges. The competition was won by Coronation Street actor Simon Gregson as his drag alter-ego "Bidet Bardot", who performed a comedy performance mentored by Myra DuBois.

Format
The one-off television special features six celebrities paired with their very own drag mentor as they unleash their drag alter-egos and attempt to master the art of drag. Each celebrity drag queen undergoes a transformation before enacting either singing, dancing, lip syncing, impressions or comedy in front of a panel of judges and a live studio audience with one celebrity being crowned the winner. The format has been compared to the American reality series RuPaul's Secret Celebrity Drag Race.

Production
In February 2022, Ant & Dec performed in drag during the "End of the Show Show" segment on Ant & Dec's Saturday Night Takeaway, and it was later reported in May that the positive reaction to the performance and the success of RuPaul's Drag Race UK on BBC Three had been a factor in ITV commissioning Queens for the Night, a one-off reality television competition that sees celebrities undergoing drag transformations. The show was officially announced by ITV in June 2022, and is created and produced by the company Tuesday's Child. Following the commissioning of the show, head of ITV entertainment Katie Rawcliffe said "[The show would] have all the wow factor you would expect from this wonderful celebration of drag, and the perfect way to showcase everything that makes drag performance such a sensation."

Celebrities
The celebrities competing in the series and their drag mentors were announced on 7 June 2022.

Performances

References

External links
 

2022 British television series debuts
2020s British reality television series
2020s British LGBT-related television series
2020s LGBT-related reality television series
English-language television shows
ITV reality television shows